Konrad Nowak (born 17 March 1985) is a Polish footballer who plays as a striker for Piaskovia Piaski. He formerly played for Lublinianka, Górnik Łęczna, Jagiellonia Białystok, Avia Świdnik, Wisła Puławy, and Motor Lublin.

Career
Nowak began his career at Wieniawa Lublin. He made his professional debut for Górnik Łęczna on 30 October 2003 against Wisła Kraków, coming on as an 80th-minute substitute. In 2004 he moved to Motor Lublin, where he played until the end of the 2005–06 season. In July 2006, Nowak joined II liga club Jagiellonia Białystok. He played 8 games for Avia Świdnik before signing for Stal Kraśnik in the same year of 2008.

Ahead of the 2009–10 season, Nowak signed for fourth-tier Wisła Puławy. In his second season Nowak made 26 league appearances for Wisła, scoring 17 goals, and helping them win promotion to II liga. In the 2015–16 season, he became part of the squad that earned promotion to I liga for the first time in club's history. In his eight years in the Wisła first team, Nowak made a total of 225 appearances in all competitions, scoring 89 goals.

On 3 July 2017, Nowak signed for III liga club Motor Lublin. In July 2019, he joined IV liga side Lewart Lubartów.

References

External links
 

1985 births
Living people
Polish footballers
Sportspeople from Lublin
KS Lublinianka players
Jagiellonia Białystok players
Avia Świdnik players
Motor Lublin players
Wisła Puławy players
Stal Kraśnik players
I liga players
II liga players
III liga players
IV liga players

Association football forwards